Mitsuko Shirai (born 28 May 1947 in Nagano) is a Japanese mezzo-soprano and music professor.

Biography
She first trained in Tokyo before settling in Germany, where she completed her vocal studies with Elisabeth Schwarzkopf. Between 1973 and 1976, she took prizes in competitions at Vienna, Zwickau, 's-Hertogenbosch, Athens, and Munich. She made her recital début in Tokyo in 1975, her European début in Amsterdam the following year.  In 1989 she made her New York début at Carnegie Hall, in Ravel's Shéhérazade.

In 1973 Shirai formed a duo with the pianist Hartmut Höll. The pair have toured extensively, performing repertory from Scarlatti to the complete vocal works of Anton Webern, and have given masterclasses in Europe, the USA and Israel.  In 1997 the two were awarded the ABC International Music Award.

Shirai has made occasional excursions into opera, including an admired Despina at Frankfurt in 1987, and has appeared in concert versions of Lucio Silla, Wagner's Das Liebesverbot, and Dukas's Ariane et Barbe-bleue.

Other orchestral appearances have been with the Berlin Philharmonic, New Japan Philharmonic, Atlanta Symphony, Nouvel Orchestre Philharmonique de Paris and the Vienna Symphony.  Conductors include Riccardo Chailly, Eliahu Inbal, Yuri Ahronovitch, Ferencic and Wolfgang Sawallisch.

Teaching
In 1992 she was appointed professor of singing at the Hochschule für Musik Karlsruhe.

She has presented masterclasses at the Savonlinna Opera Festival, the Schleswig-Holstein Musik Festival, and the Aldeburgh Festival, as well as in Switzerland, the USA, and at Isaac Stern's Jerusalem Music Centre.

Selected discographyHaydn: Arianna a Naxos; English Canzonettas (1990) Camerata Records2x Winterreise (1991) Capriccio RecordsOthmar Schoeck: Das Holde Besheiden (1993) ClavesLieder mit Viola (Songs with Viola) (1995) Capriccio RecordsSchubert-Edition: Die Schöne Müllerin; Winterreise (1997) Capriccio RecordsSchumann: Frauenliebe und –Leben, Op. 42, Liederkreis, Op. 39 (1997) Camerata RecordsWolf: Möricke Lieder (1998) Capriccio RecordsNorbert Burgmüller: Chamber Music (2000) MDGLiedOpera: Franz Schubert, Vol. 1, Op. 1–24 (2000) Capriccio RecordsSchumann: Songs/Lieder (2003) BrilliantEuropäisches Liederbuch (2003) Capriccio RecordsLied Edition (10 CDs) (2004) Capriccio RecordsPaul Dukas: Ariane et Barbe-Bleue (2011) Capriccio RecordsSchumann: Myrthen, Op. 25 (selections); Lenau Lieder, Op. 90 (unknown date) BrilliantSchubert: Abendröte; Spohr: Deutsche Lieder (unknown date) Capriccio RecordsWolf: Goethe-Lieder (unknown date) Capriccio RecordsRobert Franz: Selected Songs (unknown date) Capriccio RecordsMozart: 21 Lieder (unknown date) Delta DistributionMahler: Lieder (unknown date) Capriccio RecordsFranz Schubert: Lieder (unknown date) Capriccio RecordsRichard Strauss: Ausgewählte Lieder (unknown date) Capriccio RecordsHölderlin Gesänge (1994) Capriccio RecordsSchönberg: Ausgewählte Lieder (unknown date) Capriccio RecordsSchumann Lieder (unknown date) Capriccio RecordsSchubert: Winterreise, D 911 (unknown date) Capriccio RecordsAlban Berg: Lieder, 1900–1925 (unknown date) Capriccio RecordsSchumann: Liederkreis, Op. 39 (unknown date) Capriccio RecordsBrahms: 21 Lieder (unknown date) Capriccio RecordsWebern: Early Songs, Op. 3, 4, 12 (unknown date) Capriccio RecordsFranz Liszt: 16 Lieder (unknown date) Capriccio RecordsWolf: Songs with Orchestra'' (2012), Capriccio 5101–four orchestral songs of Wolf with the Berlin Radio Orchestra and David Shallon

Footnotes

Prizes
1982 Robert-Schumann-Preis

1996 Großen Idemitsu-Musikpreis

1997 ABC International Music Award

2008 “Verdienstmedaille am violetten Band“ donated by the Emperor of Japan

2010 Bundesverdienstkreuz

2018 “The Order of the Rising Sun, Gold Rays with Rosette” donated by the Emperor of Japan regarding her engagement for the German Lied and culture

2018 Ehrendoktorwürde by the University of Victoria / Canada (Dr. honoris causa)

References

.

External links
Discography on Allmusic.com
Discography on Naxos.com

1947 births
Living people
Japanese mezzo-sopranos
20th-century Japanese women opera singers
21st-century Japanese women opera singers
Operatic mezzo-sopranos
People from Nagano (city)
Musicians from Nagano Prefecture
Prize-winners of the ARD International Music Competition